Sarodj Bertin Durocher (born April 4, 1986) is a Haitian lawyer, best known as a beauty pageant contestant.

Early life and education
Bertin was born in Haiti, and is the daughter of Mireille Durocher and Jean Bertin. Bertin's mother, who was a lawyer and an outspoken critic of then president Jean-Bertrand Aristide, was murdered on March 28, 1995, in Port-au-Prince. She was shot in broad daylight while being driven by a client, Eugene "Junior" Baillergeau, away from the U.S. military's Camp Democracy headquarters. Baillergeau, who was killed along with Durocher Bertin, was in litigation with the U.S. military over damages a U.S. helicopter had allegedly done to his private plane.

After her mother's murder, she was sent to the Dominican Republic where she grew up in exile.

In the Dominican Republic, she learned Spanish and English, in addition to her native French and Haitian Creole.

Between 2003 and 2010, she studied law in Universidad Iberoamericana (UNIBE) of Santo Domingo and Pontificia Universidad Católica Madre y Maestra (PUCMM) of Santiago, and is currently a human rights lawyer. She has worked for the International Alliance for Haiti's Recovery.

Career
In 2015 she was elected on Luz García’s Noche de Luz programme as a "Summer’s Hot Body".

Pageantry
After the 2010 Haiti earthquake, Bertin entered the Miss Haiti Universe contest and won. She spent several months in Puerto Rico with the director of the Miss Dominican Republic and Miss Haiti franchises, Magali Febles, who took charge of her training for 2010 Miss Universe pageant.

She represented Haiti in the Miss Universe 2010 beauty pageant held in Las Vegas on August 23, 2010. Bertin believed that competing in Miss Universe would give the people of Haiti a voice, stating, "there are many people who want to help but don't know how and sometimes they need a voice to tell them what are the necessities of the people. I want the people, through me, to be who says what their necessities are." On 25 October 2012, she won the Reina Hispanoamericana 2012 pageant.

Radio and television
 Telenoticias (w:es:Telesistema; 2014–2015)
 Aquí Se Habla Español (w:es:Antena Latina; 2014–present)

Filmography
 Boone: The Bounty Hunter – Crystal 2015
 Ulterior Motives: Reality TV Massacre – Amber 2015
 Sharktopus vs. Mermantula (TV Movie) – Widow 2014
 The Heartbreaker's Revenge – Rochelle 2014 (directed by Dalyboy Belgason)
 One Night in Vegas – Ashley 2013
 Everybody Cheats – Francesca 2013
 Sweet Micky for President – (Documentary) Herself 2014
 Voodoo's List – (Documentary) 2011

Awards
 2013 MPAH Haiti Movie Awards Humanitarian Award Recipient* Motion Picture Association of Haiti
 2015 MPAH Haiti Movie Awards Best supporting actress - Heart Breaker's revenge.

See also
 Evelyn Miot - Miss Haiti Universe 1962

References

External links
 
MyAyiti: Sarodj Bertin crowned Miss Haiti Universe 2010
Canadian Press: Interview of Sarodj Bertin

1986 births
Living people
People from Port-au-Prince
Miss Universe 2010 contestants
Haitian beauty pageant winners
Haitian female models
20th-century Dominican Republic lawyers
Haitian people of Mulatto descent
Pontificia Universidad Católica Madre y Maestra alumni
Universidad Iberoamericana alumni
Haitian expatriates in the Dominican Republic
Haitian exiles
21st-century Haitian actresses
20th-century Haitian people